Shiwang'andu District is a district of Muchinga Province, Zambia. It was created in February 2013 by splitting Chinsali District. It is named after Lake Ishiba Ng'andu and the district also contains the Shiwa Ngandu Estate.

References 

Districts of Muchinga Province